Myconita plutelliformis is a moth in the family Gelechiidae. It was described by Snellen in 1901. It is found in India, Indonesia (Java) and Australia, where it has been recorded from the Northern Territory and Queensland.

The wingspan is about 10 mm. The forewings are dark brown with a broad pale stripe along the inner margin. The hindwings are pale brown.

References

Moths described in 1901
Dichomeridinae